The LTZ1000 is a high-precision, ultra-stable Zener diode voltage reference originally developed by Carl Nelson for Linear Technology. It consists of a Zener reference packaged along with an integrated heater and temperature sensor designed to hold the device at a constant temperature for improved stability.

Overview 
The LTZ1000's internal reference is an ovenized Zener diode that is kept at a constant temperature by an internal resistive heater. An internal sensing transistor is used in tandem with external hardware to drive the heater and maintain the reference's constant internal temperature. Because of its high sensitivity, the LTZ1000 must be thermally isolated from the rest of the circuit and housed in an enclosure that is well shielded from air currents for optimal performance. The device's output voltage ranges from 7 to 7.5V on a chip-to-chip basis, with a noise figure of 1.2µV peak to peak and a long-term drift of 2µV/√kHr.

Applications 
The LTZ1000 is a popular reference for many high-precision metrology applications, and has served as the internal voltage reference for many high-precision devices such as the HP3458A 8½ digit multimeter and CERN's HPM7177 8½ digit voltmeter, which is used in the Large Hadron Collider. It is also very popular among hobbyists seeking to produce their own voltage references for calibrating equipment or obtaining highly precise voltage measurements.

References 

Diodes